Françoise Guittet née Françoise Marie Renee Jacqueline Gouny (12 April 1925 – 24 August 2009) was a French fencer. She competed in the women's individual foil event at the 1948 Summer Olympics.

References

External links
 

1925 births
2009 deaths
Fencers from Paris
French female foil fencers
Olympic fencers of France
Fencers at the 1948 Summer Olympics
20th-century French women